Marius Pieter Louis Klumperbeek (born 7 August 1938) is a retired Dutch coxswain who competed in the 1960 and 1964 Summer Olympics. In 1960 his coxed four team was eliminated in the semi-finals; he won a bronze medal in the same event four years later.

References

1938 births
Living people
Dutch male rowers
Coxswains (rowing)
Olympic rowers of the Netherlands
Rowers at the 1960 Summer Olympics
Rowers at the 1964 Summer Olympics
Olympic bronze medalists for the Netherlands
Olympic medalists in rowing
People from Batavia, Dutch East Indies
Medalists at the 1964 Summer Olympics
20th-century Dutch people